Botryodontia is a genus of fungi belonging to the family Hymenochaetaceae.

Species:
 Botryodontia millavensis

References

Phanerochaetaceae
Polyporales genera